Bealanana is a district in northern Madagascar. It is a part of Sofia Region and borders the districts of Ambanja in north, Ambilobe in northeast, Andapa in east, Befandriana-Nord in south, Antsohihy in southwest and Analalava in west.

Communes
The district is further divided into 13 communes:

 Ambalaromba
 Ambatoriha
 Ambatosia
 Ambodiadabo
 Ambodisikidy
 Ambonomby
 Analila
 Antananivo Haut
 Antsamaka
 Bealanana
 Beandrarezona
 Mangidrano
 Marotolana

Roads
Bealanana is connected with the rest of the country by the RN 31 that leads from Bealanana to the junction with the RN 6 near Andrafia.

References and notes

Districts of Sofia Region